Sirāj al-Dīn Abū Yaʿqūb Yūsuf al-Sakkākī al-Khwārizmī (سراج الدين ابو يعقوب يوسف بن محمد السكاكي) was a Persian Muslim scholar famous for works on language, rhetoric, magic, and talismans. Like many scholars of his region and era, he wrote primarily in Arabic, although his book al-Tilasm (The Talisman) was written in Persian.

Sakkākī was born in 1160 AD (555 AH) in Khwarazm, Central Asia, where he lived most of his life. He died in 1228-1229 AD (626 AH) in Qaryat al-Kindi near Farghana, in present-day Uzbekistan.

Not much is known about his life. There is a hagiographical account saying that he was originally a blacksmith. When he was 30, he constructed an iron chest for the king. When he brought it to the court, he saw the members of course sitting in admiration of a man. He asked who that man was, and he was told he was a scholar. Sakkaki expressed his desire to become a scholar, at which time he was told that he was too old. In response, he dedicated himself to learning. Ten years later, he was still struggling with his studies. Frustrated, he went into the mountains, looked at the rocks, and decided that his heart (in his era, considered the center of intellect) was not harder than the rocks, rededicated himself to his studies, and became a famous scholar.

In any case, it is recorded that he had connections with the state, in that he was said to have created a magical statue or image for the king at the time ('Ala al-Din Khwarazm-Shah) to use in his war against the 'Abbasid caliph al-Nasir. Biographical literature also credited him with the ability to use magical powers to strike down cranes in mid-flight.

In 2001, a copy of one of his handwritten manuscripts on magic, entitled Kitab al-Shamil wa Bahr al-Kamil (The Encompassing Book and Ocean of Perfection), was sold by auction for GBP 2,350.

While he is said to have written on a breadth of subjects, his surviving works include:
 Miftah al-'Ulum (The Key to Knowledge, on rhetoric)
 Kitab al-Jumal (The Book of Sentences, commentary on a pre-existing work by a similar name)
 al-Tibyan (The Clarification)
 al-Tilasm (The Talisman, in Persian)
 Risalah fi 'Ilm al-Manazirah (A Treatise on Debating)
 Kitab al-Shamil wa Bahr al-Kamil (The Encompassing Book and Ocean of Perfection)

References 

12th-century Persian-language writers
1160 births
1220s deaths
13th-century Persian-language writers
12th-century Iranian people
13th-century Iranian people